A rotula is a roll consisting of a long and narrow strip of writing material wound around a wooden axle or rod and written on its interior side.

Rotula is also the name of several genera of plants and animals:
Rotula, a monotypic plant genus represented by Rotula aquatica
 Rotula (echinoderm), a genus of echinoderms in the family Rotulidae
Rotula, see List of prehistoric echinoderm genera